Thetis was the name of a floating radar decoy used by German U-boats during the Second World War.

The device was stored dismantled in the bow compartment as a pole about two metres long. Assembly usually took place in the U-boat's conning tower, and could be assembled in about four minutes (FuMT 2 - Thetis IIC). Later versions could be launched from a standard torpedo tube (FuMT 4 - Thetis US). When deployed, it was extended to a total length of eight metres, half of which was submerged. The upper half had a series of reflectors that were tuned to Allied anti-submarine radar wavelengths to give the same return signal as a U-boat. The number of Thetis decoys carried varied between different U-boats:
 carried approximately 12 units during her 10th and last patrol between 16 January 1944 and 6 May; all were used in the Bay of Biscay.
 carried 16 units during her 6th and last patrol between 25 January 1944 and 25 February.
 carried an unknown number of units during her 21st and last patrol between 23 April 1944 and 4 May.
 carried 15 units during her 13th and last patrol between 29 February 1944 and 13 March. U-575 would surface every night and laid a total of 10 on her outward voyage, the remaining units were to have been laid in the same area on her return.
 carried 20 units during her 2nd and last patrol between 24 February 1944 and 6 March. U-744 used them on her outward voyage between 11°W and 12°W in the Bay of Biscay.

The first time the Allies knew about the "Thetis" was in a coded radio message to all U-boats transmitted on 11 January 1944. "Thetis" was introduced in January, when large numbers were released into the Bay of Biscay in July to simulate U-boat patrols during the Battle of Normandy.

See also
 Bold (decoy)

References

Weapons countermeasures